Awaaz (transl. Voice) is a 1984 Hindi action crime film directed by Shakti Samanta with Rajesh Khanna in the lead role and supported by Jaya Prada, Rakesh Roshan, Suresh Oberoi, Supriya Pathak, Iftekar, Prem Chopra, Madan Puri and Amrish Puri.
The music is by R.D.Burman. The songs are sung by Kishore Kumar for Rajesh, and by Asha Bhonsle for the females.
This film marked the first return of the Shakti-Rajesh team after Anurodh in 1977

Plot
Advocate Jayant (Rajesh Khanna), a criminal lawyer, believes that a lawyer's duty is to do service to his client alone and to bail him out of his trouble, even if his client is in reality a criminal. His close friend Amit is an honest police inspector who brings many of the goons that are part of gang of smugglers led by Mulchand Malhotra, but they are let off by the court when he uses his skills and knowledge about the loopholes in law. Jayant helps Mulchand in setting his workmen free from jail. Amit Gupta asks Jayant to be more responsible when he defends criminals, who are repeat offenders. Later Amit is killed and this motivates Amit's brother Vijay to join the police force. Meanwhile, Priya (Jayant's sister) falls in love with Vijay and both decide to marry. But one day while going on a picnic Anu (Jayant's wife) and Priya get into trouble as their car tire gets punctured on a road near a jungle. There, a drunkard who happens to be Mulchand's son rapes Anu and injures Priya. On being humiliated, Anu commits suicide. Jayant also gets a clue that the death of his friend Amit was not accidental, but was a deliberate attempt by some goons and that the rapist is a person known to Mulchand and his gang members. Jayant tries enlisting the help of his clients Mulchand and Meerchandani in finding the real culprits, but realises that they are not responsive. Jayant vows to find the assailants, but before he can attempt anything his daughter, Nandita, is kidnapped. The kidnappers want Jayant to represent Mulchand's son in a criminal case, and get him acquitted. Mulchand says his daughter is with them and would be left once his son is let off in a court of law. Jayant gets his client out on bail. Jayant does not know that his client is the one who had raped his wife and sister, and when Jayant does find out there is nothing he can do since his daughter is still under the control of her kidnappers. The rest of the story is how he single-handedly brings all of them to justice.

Reception
Awaaz was well appreciated by audience and critics alike. It received three stars in the Bollywood guide Collections. It also became a box office "Hit". Awaaz fetched Rs. 3.60 crores in the year 1984 at the box office.

Cast

Rajesh Khanna as Advocate Jayant
Rakesh Roshan as  Police Inspector Vijay Gupta
Jaya Prada as Anu wife of Jayant
Suresh Oberoi as  IPS Inspector Amit Gupta, elder Brother of Vijay Gupta
Amrish Puri as Mulchand Malhotra
Prem Chopra as Gagan Bihari Lal
Madan Puri as Mirchandani
Supriya Pathak Priya, sister of Jayant/Wife of Vijay Gupta
 Mac Mohan as Rustam
 Sudhir as Symond Perreira
 Beena Banerjee as Beena Gupta
 Monty Nath as Suresh Malhotra, son of Mulchand Malhotra
 Iftekhar as Police Commissioner 
 Manik Irani as Gurunath Police Informer
 Anirudh Agarwal as  Changezi, Malhotra Henchman
 Amarnath Mukherjee as Judge who gives Death Sentence Advocate Jayant at last scene of Movie

Music
Lyrics: Anand Bakshi

"Zindagi Sau Baras Ki" – Kishore Kumar, Asha Bhosle
"Bolo Pyar Karogi" – Kishore Kumar, Asha Bhosle
"Aa Jaaneman Aaj Tujhe" – Kishore Kumar
"Ankhon Ki Zuban Ne" –  Kishore Kumar, Asha Bhosle
"Zindagi Awaaz Deti Hai" – Asha Bhosle
"Zindagi Sau Baras Ki" – Kishore Kumar
Theme Music – Manohari Singh

References

External links

1984 films
1980s Hindi-language films
Films directed by Shakti Samanta
Fictional portrayals of police departments in India
Films scored by R. D. Burman
Indian rape and revenge films